Mehndi Rang Layegi is a 1982 Indian Hindi-language romance film, produced by Pradeep Sharma and Veer Jain under the Tutu Veer Films banner and directed by Dasari Narayana Rao. It stars Jeetendra, Rekha, Anita Raj  and music composed by Laxmikant–Pyarelal. The film is a remake of the Telugu film Gorintaku (1979).

Plot
Tagore Dindayal (Kader Khan) who is a drunkard, neglects his family, wife Rama (Sharada) and two children. Once he beats his daughter very badly and she dies, seeing this his son Ramu reacts on his father and his mother slaps him and in anger, he runs away from home. Ramu (Jeetendra) studies on charity and reaches till medico and in the medical college meets Kalpana (Rekha) his co-student. Both of them love each other, but hesitate to convey. Ramu tutors Kalpana's siblings and lives in her out-house. After some time, they think that neither of them have any intention of love and Kalpana is married off to Anand, who is already married and this fact comes to light after the marriage, so Kalpana divorces him and comes back. Meanwhile, Ramu meets Padma (Anita Raj) and falls in love and the story turns into triangle. Finally, Kalpana sacrifices her love by uniting Ramu and Padma in the end.

Cast
Jeetendra as Ramu
Rekha as Kalpana
Anita Raj as Padma
Ashok Kumar
Kader Khan as Tagore Dindayal
Asrani
Sudhir Dalvi
Kumar Aditya
Sharada as Rama
Aruna Irani
Sarla Yeolekar
Ashalata Wabgaonkar
Nandita
Aradhana

Soundtrack

References

External links
 

1982 films
1980s Hindi-language films
Films directed by Dasari Narayana Rao
Films scored by Laxmikant–Pyarelal
Hindi remakes of Telugu films